This a list of the 320 members of the 17th legislature of the Italian Senate, they were elected in the 2013 general election and assumed office on 15 March 2013.

Senators for life are marked with a "(L)"

The Government

Partito Democratico

New Centre-right

For Italy
Pier Ferdinando Casini
Antonio De Poli
Aldo Di Biagio
Salvatore Tito Di Maggio
Angela D'Onghia
Luigi Marino
Mario Mauro
Maria Paola Merloni
Andrea Olivero
Lucio Romano

Civic Choice
Gianpiero Dalla Zuanna
Benedetto Della Vedova
Stefania Giannini
Pietro Ichino
Linda Lanzillotta
Alessandro Maran
Mario Monti (L)
Gianluca Susta

Group Per le Autonomie
Giulio Andreotti (L)
Hans Berger
Enrico Buemi
Elena Cattaneo (L)
Emilio Colombo (L)
Mario Ferrara
Vittorio Fravezzi
Albert Laniece
Fausto Guilherme Longo
Riccardo Nencini
Francesco Palermo
Franco Panizza
Carlo Rubbia (L)
Karl Zeller
Claudio Zin

The Opposition

Forza Italia

Five Star Movement

Lega Nord

Grandi Autonomie e Libertà
Lucio Barani
Giuseppe Compagnone
Vincenzo D'Anna
Michelino Davico
Pietro Langella
Giovanni Mauro
Antonio Milo
Giuseppe Ruvolo
Antonio Fabio Scavone
Giulio Tremonti

Left Ecology Freedom
Giovanni Barozzino
Massimo Cervellini
Peppe De Cristofaro
Loredana De Petris
Alessia Petraglia
Dario Stefano
Luciano Uras

Independents
Claudio Abbado (L)
Fabiola Anitori
Alessandra Bencini
Fabrizio Bocchino
Francesco Campanella
Monica Casaletto
Carlo Azeglio Ciampi (L)
Paola De Pin
Adele Gambaro
Marino Germano Mastrangeli
Maria Mussini
Luis Alberto Orellana
Bartolomeo Pepe
Renzo Piano (L)
Maurizio Romani
Maurizio Rossi

References

Lists of political office-holders in Italy
Lists of legislators by term
Lists of members of upper houses